The Mozambique women's national under-18 and under-19 basketball team is a national basketball team of Mozambique, governed by the Federação Moçambicana de Basquetebol. It represents the country in international under-18 and under-19 (under age 18 and under age 19) women's basketball competitions.

See also
Mozambique women's national basketball team
Mozambique women's national under-16 basketball team

References

External links
Archived records of Mozambique team participations

Basketball in Mozambique
Basketball teams in Mozambique
Women's national under-19 basketball teams
Basketball